Başak Parlak (born 3 November 1989) is a Turkish actress and model.

The breakthrough in her career came in 2007 with a role in the TV series Fikrimin İnce Gülü, followed by another role in the 2008 series Serçe. In 2013, she had a leading role in the movie Şevkat Yerimdar and reprised the role in its 2016 sequel Şevkat Yerimdar 2: Bizde Sakat Çok.

In 2017, she portrayed the character of Seda in the TV series Kış Güneşi, which lasted for 18 episodes. Between 2017 and 2018, she appeared in the TV series Şevkat Yerimdar, an adaptation of the movie with the same name.

Filmography

Film

TV series

References

External links 

1989 births
Turkish television actresses
Turkish film actresses
Living people